GOtv Africa is a pay television terrestrial service in sub-Saharan Africa owned by broadcaster MultiChoice and founded 2011. It mainly consists of African and international programming.

History
The terrestrial TV service was founded in October 2011 by MultiChoice. It features news channels such as the BBC, Al Jazeera and CNN, sports channels such as SuperSport and ESPN, local & international content from Africa Magic and M-Net Movies among others, including free-to-air channels. It is currently available in countries such as Nigeria, Kenya, Namibia, Ghana, Malawi, Zambia, Zimbabwe, Mozambique and Uganda. The current director general of the company is John Ugbe.

In Kenya, one can use the GOtv Paybill Number 423655 to pay for their subscription via M-PESA Make sure your GOtv decoder is turned on before making payment.

References

External links 
 Official website
 Official website for Nigeria

2011 establishments in Africa
Direct broadcast satellite services
Satellite television
Television in Nigeria